Julie H. Kocurek (born October 2, 1964) is an American attorney and judge who is currently a Texas state court judge, having served as presiding judge of the 390th District Court in Austin, Texas since January 1999, being appointed by then-governor George W. Bush. Prior to serving as a Texas state judge, Kocurek served as an Assistant District Attorney in Travis County for seven years.

On November 6, 2015, Kocurek survived an assassination attempt outside of her Austin home. She returned to work in February 2016.

Early life 
Originally from Dayton, Texas, Kocurek graduated from Dayton High School, then received a B.A. in economics from the University of Texas at Austin, and a J.D. from St. Mary's University School of Law in 1990. Kocurek was an Assistant District Attorney in the Travis County District Attorney's Office for seven years, under District Attorney Ronnie Earle. She became board certified in criminal law in 1998, and in 1999 was appointed by Governor George W. Bush to a seat on the newly created 390th district court, becoming the first female district judge in Travis County.

State judicial service 
Her caseload has included presiding over cases brought against Texas governor Rick Perry and U.S Congressman Tom DeLay.
In Perry's case, Kocurek presided briefly before recusing herself from the matter due to her previous association with the Travis County District Attorney's Office, and transferring the matter to judge Billy Ray Stubblefield, who assigned the matter to senior state district judge Bert Richardson. Kocurek dispelled a claim made by former Alaska governor Sarah Palin that the case had been brought by Travis County District Attorney Rosemary Lehmberg, whom Perry had tried to force from office.

Assassination attempt 
On November 6, 2015, Kocurek was shot and seriously wounded by an assailant in the driveway of her home in the Tarrytown neighborhood as she and her son were returning home from a football game at her high school. Kocurek lost a finger due to the attack, but was able to return to the courtroom by February 2016.

The culprit behind the attack was Chimene Onyeri, an aspiring rapper whom Kocurek previously sentenced for running a tax refund scam. On April 26, 2018, a federal jury convicted Onyeri of all 17 counts charged against him, including charges related to the assassination attempt. Onyeri was found guilty of fraud, theft, and a racketeering charge linked to the attempted murder of Judge Kocurek and was sentenced to life in federal prison. Had Kocurek died from her injuries, Onyeri would likely have faced the death penalty. Onyeri is currently serving his sentence at United States Penitentiary, Florence High, having been transferred there from Pollock.

References

Texas state court judges
University of Texas alumni
St. Mary's University School of Law alumni
American shooting survivors
Living people
People from Dayton, Texas
1964 births